Calcicludine (CaC) is a protein toxin from the venom of the green mamba that inhibits high-voltage-activated calcium channels, especially L-type calcium channels.

Sources 
Calcicludine is a toxin in the venom of the green mamba (Dendroaspis angusticeps).

Chemistry 
Calcicludine is a 60-amino acid polypeptide with six cysteines forming three disulfide bridges. Calcicludine structurally resembles dendrotoxin, but works differently, since even at high concentrations, calcicludine has no effect on dendrotoxin-sensitive potassium channels in chicken and rat neurons.

Target 
Calcicludine is a blocker of high-voltage-activated calcium channels (L-, N- and P-type channels). It  has highest affinity to the L-type calcium channel (IC50 = 88nM[2]). However, sensitivity of the drug on the channel depends on the species and the tissue. For example, the IC50 for block of L-type calcium channels on a cerebellar granule cell is 0.2 nM, but the IC50 of the block of rat peripheral DRG neuronal L-type channels is around 60-80 nM.

Mode of Action 
Calcicludine has a unique mode of action, which is still incompletely understood. It has been suggested to  act by a partial pore block or an effect on channel gating.

Toxicity 
Calcicludine has been shown to work on rat cardiac cells and rat cerebellum granule cells.

References

Dendroaspis
Neurotoxins
Vertebrate toxins
Ion channel toxins